There have been 60 women in the New South Wales Legislative Council since its establishment in 1856. Women have had the right to stand as a candidate since 1918; the Council introduced direct election in 1978.

The first women appointed to the Legislative Council were Catherine Green and Ellen Webster in 1931, both appointed directly by the premier, Jack Lang. Green departed in 1932; after Webster's departure in 1934 women were absent from the Council until 1952, when Gertrude Melville became the first woman elected by the New South Wales Parliament to serve. Since then women have been continuously represented in the Legislative Council. The first Liberal woman to serve in the Legislative Council was Eileen Furley in 1962. The first National Party woman was Judy Jakins in 1984. The first minor-party woman was Democrat Elisabeth Kirkby, elected in 1981. The first Call to Australia/Christian Democrat woman was Marie Bignold in 1984; the first Greens woman was Lee Rhiannon in 1999. No female MLCs have been elected as independents, although Anne Press, Marie Bignold, Beryl Evans, Franca Arena and Helen Sham-Ho all left their parties and continued to sit as independents.

The first female minister in the Legislative Council was Virginia Chadwick, who was appointed Minister for Family and Community Services in 1988 by Premier Nick Greiner. Deirdre Grusovin and Carmel Tebbutt held ministerial positions in Labor governments before transferring to the Legislative Assembly.

List of women in the New South Wales Legislative Council
Names in bold type indicate ministers and parliamentary secretaries. Names in italics are of women who entered the parliament through by-election or appointment. Names marked with an asterisk (*) also served in the Legislative Assembly. Where no closing date is shown, the MLC’s term of service is unexpired.

Timeline

Proportion of women in the Council
Numbers and proportions are as they were directly after the beginning of Council terms and do not take into account deaths, resignations, appointments, defections or other changes in membership.

References

 
New South Wales